The Cato Trough or Chesterfield Trough is an oceanic trough in the Coral Sea of the South Pacific Ocean. The trough is underlain by oceanic crust, having formed as a result of seafloor spreading from about 63 to 50 million years ago.

References

External links
Marine Gazetteer Placedetails

Coral Sea
Oceanic trenches of the Pacific Ocean